Lisa Evers (born June 15, 1958) is an American general assignment reporter for FOX 5 News, host of the Street Soldiers with Lisa Evers TV and radio show in New York City, a former high-ranking Guardian Angel, and a long-time community volunteer for urban, youth and children's charities.

Charitable work
With the support of FOX 5 and HOT 97, Evers led a drive that brought a truckload of new clothes, sneakers, and toys to survivors of Hurricane Katrina. More recently, along with the Hip Hop Has Heart Foundation, she helped organize a major relief effort in the Rockaways, following Super Storm Sandy.

Modeling career
Evers was discovered by a fashion photographer who saw her on the subway and took some test shots, which led her to a modeling contract with Elite Model Management in the 1980s. With Elite, she worked in New York and Paris, and appeared in a variety of magazines around the world, including French editions of Elle and Vogue, as well as magazines in Australia, India, and the UK.

Martial arts
Evers has a black belt in karate and has been featured in self-defense videos for women. In 1987, she was the first woman to be inducted into the Black Belt Hall of Fame as "Woman of the Year". Additionally, she authored several monthly columns in Black Belt magazine between 1986 and 1994.

Guardian Angels
Evers was once vice-president of the Guardian Angels, a volunteer crime-fighting organization. At that time she was married to its founder, Curtis Sliwa, was known as Lisa Sliwa, and worked as a model with Elite Model Management in New York City and Paris. With Sliwa, she co-hosted a talk radio show on WABC-AM in New York City that ended shortly before their divorce.

World Wrestling Federation
In the 1980s, Evers briefly attempted to become a professional wrestler and joined the World Wrestling Federation. She appeared on Tuesday Night Titans in 1985 and demonstrated several self-defense holds.

Journalism

In 2016, the long-running HOT 97 show "Street Soldiers with Lisa Evers was turned into a weekly TV show on FOX 5 in New York, airing Friday nights at 10:30 pm. Her list of exclusive one-on-one interviews with big-name hip hop celebrities continues to grow, from 50 Cent's first television interview (FOX 5 News 2003) to Diddy, Jay-Z, DMX, Fetty Wap, and many more.

She began at WINS as a freelance reporter, and she was also working for CNN Radio Network and the ABC Radio Network.

References

External links

 
 Fox 5 Bio

1958 births
American television journalists
Place of birth missing (living people)
Living people
American female professional wrestlers
Professional wrestlers from Illinois
American women television journalists
21st-century American women
20th-century American women